Cobosesta mandli is a species of beetles in the family Buprestidae, the only species in the genus Cobosesta.

References

Monotypic Buprestidae genera